Rhys James (born Rhys Jones, 30 April 1991) is an English stand-up comedian. James has appeared on Mock the Week and Live at the Apollo.

Personal Life 
James studied for a politics and international relations degree at Manchester University, starting his stand-up career in 2010 whilst still a student. He is a football fan and supports Tottenham Hotspur.

Career 
James has appeared on Mock the Week, Russell Howard's Stand Up Central, @elevenish, Virtually Famous and Sweat the Small Stuff. In 2010 he performed as part of the Pleasance Comedy Reserve at the Edinburgh Fringe, was a finalist in the Laughing Boy New Act Competition and placed 3rd in 'Comedy Central's Funniest Student'. James also appeared on certain YouTube channels such as The Football Republic (Top 10 Football F*ck Up's) and Spurred On. In 2022, he was a guest host on Ed Gamble and Matthew Crosby's Radio X show.

In 2019, James embarked on his first nationwide tour Snitch, which was completed in 2021 after delays due to the COVID-19 pandemic.

Live shows 

 Begins (2014)
 Remains (2015)
 Forgives (2016)
 Snitch (2019-2021)
 Spilt Milk (2023)

Podcasts 
James has been featured on numerous podcasts, including Brett Goldstein's Films To Be Buried With and Jamie Laing's Private Parts.

In 2020, James began hosting a podcast called Early Work which featured conversations with performers about their early creative material.

In 2022, James started hosting Fit & Proper alongside Lloyd Griffith. This podcast sees a weekly guest hypothetically rebuild a football club of their choosing.

Television

References

External links

 
 
 
 
 

1991 births
Living people
21st-century English comedians
Alumni of the University of Manchester
Comedians from London
English male comedians
People from Shoreditch